The 39 Steps is a parody adapted from the 1915 novel by John Buchan and the 1935 film by Alfred Hitchcock. The original concept and production of a four-actor version of the story was by Simon Corble and Nobby Dimon. Patrick Barlow rewrote this adaptation in 2005.

The play's concept calls for the entirety of the 1935 adventure film The 39 Steps to be performed with a cast of only four. One actor plays the hero, Richard Hannay, an actress (or sometimes actor) plays the three women with whom he has romantic entanglements, and two other actors play every other character in the show: heroes, villains, men, women, children and even the occasional inanimate object. This often requires lightning-fast quick-changes and occasionally for them to play multiple characters at once. Thus the film's serious spy story is played mainly for laughs, and the script is full of allusions to (and puns on the titles of) other Alfred Hitchcock films, including Strangers on a Train, Rear Window, Psycho, Vertigo and North by Northwest.

Production history
The first version of the play written by Simon Corble and Nobby Dimon for a cast of four actors and funded by a £1,000 Yorkshire Arts Grant, premiered in 1995 before an audience of 90 people at the Georgian Theatre Royal in Richmond, North Yorkshire, before embarking on a tour of village halls across the north of England.

In 2005 Patrick Barlow rewrote the script, keeping the scenes, staging and small-scale feel, and on June 17, 2005, this re-adaptation premiered at the West Yorkshire Playhouse, directed by Fiona Buffini and designed by Peter McKintosh. The featured actors were Robert Whitelock, Lisa Jackson, Simon Gregor and Mark Hadfield. Maria Aitken directed the revised production in its London premiere at the Tricycle Theatre (London), which opened on 10 August 2006 titled John Buchan's The 39 Steps. The cast for the London premiere comprised Rupert Degas, Charles Edwards, Simon Gregor and Catherine McCormack, again with designs by Peter McKintosh. The production transferred to the Criterion Theatre in London's West End in September 2006. The 39 Steps closed on 5 September 2015 after 9 years in the West End, making it the fifth longest running play in West End history.

On 27 August 2008 a Spanish production opened at Maravillas Theatre in Madrid directed by Eduardo Bazo and starring Gabino Diego, Jorge de Juan, Diego Molero and Patricia Conde (later replaced by Beatriz Rico).

United States premiere
The play premiered the U.S. at the Boston University Theatre, by the Huntington Theatre Company, in Boston on 19 September 2007. Billed as Alfred Hitchcock's The 39 Steps, it opened on Broadway in a Roundabout Theatre production at the American Airlines Theatre, with previews beginning on 4 January 2008 and the official opening on 15 January 2008. The initial run concluded on 29 March 2008 and transferred to the Cort Theatre on 29 April 2008 and then transferred to the Helen Hayes Theatre on 21 January 2009. Aitken also directed the United States productions, with McKintosh designing, and Edwards transferred to these productions as Richard Hannay, the only actor from the UK cast to do so. The other actors in the premiere US productions were Jennifer Ferrin, Arnie Burton and Cliff Saunders. Edwards concluded his run on 6 July 2008 and Sam Robards took over the role of Richard Hannay.

Jeffrey Kuhn and Francesca Faridany joined the cast on 28 October 2008. In December 2008 it was announced that Sean Mahon would take over the role of Richard Hannay. The show had its final Broadway performance on 10 January 2010 after 771 performances, "the longest-running Broadway play in seven years" (according to the writer for Playbill.com). The 39 Steps transferred to the off-Broadway venue New World Stages, reopening on 25 March 2010.

On 1 April 2015, performances of the play, subtly retitled "39 Steps", resumed at the Union Square Theatre with the entire original creative team, and starring Robert Petkoff as Hannay, Brittany Vicars as the women, Billy Carter as Man #1. Arnie Burton resumed his long-running stint as Man #2; a role he continued until the 'clock' for his tenure reached 1000 performances on 28 September 2015. Mark Cameron Pow replaced Arnie Burton in the role and the production continued performances until 3 January 2016, when the theatre and building were closed for repurposing of the building into creative office space and high-end retail. This production, produced by Douglas Denoff, ran 317 performances to 61,590 ticket holders ranging in age from 5 years to 103, and each received a trademark red nose in honor of the plays' branding "Hitchcock Made Hilarious". A Broadway return for this production is anticipated in 2018–2019.

Awards
The play won the Olivier Award for Best Comedy in 2007 and the What's On Stage Award for Best Comedy 2007.

The 2008 Roundabout Broadway production won the 2008 Drama Desk Award for Unique Theatrical Experience and Outstanding Lighting Design (Kevin Adams). It won two Tony Awards on 15 June 2008 for Best Lighting Design in a Play and Best Sound Design. It was nominated for four other Tonys: Best Play, Best Direction of a Play (Maria Aitken), Best Scenic Design of a Play (Peter McKintosh) and Best Costume Design of a Play (Peter McKintosh).

Film references & production notes
The play shares the plot and characters with the film. However, the play is a more comic treatment of the story, in the style of Monty Python and Barlow's own National Theatre of Brent, compared to the original and more serious film. The play incorporates references and use of music excerpts from other Hitchcock films. The cast of four actors portrays between 100 and 150 roles, including actors doubling parts within the same scene. The quick, comic changes are reminiscent of Charles Ludlam's The Mystery of Irma Vep. The actress playing Annabella Schmidt also plays the two other romantic females, Pamela and Margaret, while the two clowns play nearly all the other roles. The part of Richard Hannay is the only one where the actor does not double in another role in the play.

Roles

Productions
Apart from the transfers to London and Broadway, this lists only the first production in a country.

 2005, Leeds – West Yorkshire Playhouse
 2006, London – Tricycle Theatre
 2006, London West End – Criterion Theatre
 2007, Boston – Huntington Theatre
 2008, New York City, Broadway – American Airlines Theatre, Cort Theatre, Helen Hayes Theatre
 2008, Melbourne – Playhouse, Victorian Arts Centre (Melbourne Theatre Company)
 2008, Aachen – Grenzlandttheater, first performance in German
 2008, Tel Aviv – Habima Theatre, in Hebrew
 2008, Hong Kong – Lyric Theatre, Hong Kong Academy for Performing Arts
 2008, Mexico City – Ramiro Jiménez Theatre
 2008, Athens – Knossos Theatre, Greek adaptation
 2008, Madrid – Maravillas Theatre, in Spanish
 2008, Turku – Åbo Svenska Teater, in Swedish
 2008, Tampere – Komediateatteri, in Finnish
 2009, Paris – Paris théâtre Labruyere
 2009, South Korea – Sejong Arts Center
 2009, Wellington – Circa Theatre
 2009, Warsaw, Poland – Teatr Komedia (in Polish)
 2010, Gananoque, Ontario – The Thousand Islands Playhouse (Canadian Premiere)
 2010, Buenos Aires, Argentina – Teatro Piccadilly
 2010, São Paulo, Brazil – Teatro Frei Caneca
 2011, Makati City, Philippines-Greenbelt, Ayala Center
 2011, Montevideo, Uruguay – Gran Teatro Metro
 2011, Barcelona, Spain – Teatre Capitol
 2012, Shanghai, China, Shanghai American School
 2012, Dubai, United Arab Emirates [Backstage Theatre Group]
 2013, Stockholm, Sweden – Intiman theatre
 2013, Nuremberg, Germany – Staatstheater, in German
 2015, Halifax, Nova Scotia – Neptune Theatre
 2015, Kincardine, Ontario- Bluewater Summer Playhouse
 2015 American Stage St Petersburg, Florida
 2017, Alley Theatre, Houston, Texas
 2017, The Lake Charles Little Theatre, Lake Charles, Louisiana, starring Clay Hebert and Alex Landry.
 2017, Oakhill College, Castle Hill, Sydney
 2017, Alberta, Calgary, Vertigo Theater
 2018, Springfield Little Theatre, Springfield, Missouri
 2019, Muskegon Civic Theater, Muskegon, Michigan
 2019, Costa Mesa Playhouse, Costa Mesa, California
 2020, Uxbridge Music Hall, Uxbridge, Ontario
 2022, St. Lawrence Shakespeare Festival, Prescott, Ontario
 2022, University College Dublin, Dublin, Ireland, directed by Morgan Ward

Awards and nominations
 Awards
 2007 Laurence Olivier Award for Best New Comedy
 2008 Drama Desk Award for Outstanding Lighting Design (Kevin Adams)
 2008 Drama Desk Award for Unique Theatrical Experience
 2008 Tony Award for Best Lighting Design in a Play (Kevin Adams)
 2008 Tony Award for Best Sound Design of a Play (Mic Pool)
 2009 Helpmann Award for Best Regional Touring Production
 2009 Molière France Best Comedy
 Nominations
 2008 Tony Award for Best Play
 2008 Tony Award for Best Direction of a Play (Maria Aitken)
 2008 Tony Award for Best Scenic Design of a Play (Peter McKintosh)
 2008 Tony Award for Best Costume Design of a Play (Peter McKintosh)
 2008 Drama Desk Award for Outstanding Sound Design (Mic Pool)
 2009 Molière France révélation Actress Andrea Bescond
 2009 Molière France Best Director Métayer Éric
 2009 Molière France Best adaptation Gerald Sibleyras

References

External links

 
 Broadway website
 

2006 plays
Broadway plays
Comedy plays
John Buchan
Laurence Olivier Award-winning plays
Off-Broadway plays
Plays based on films
Plays based on novels
Plays set in the 1930s
Plays set in London
Plays set in Scotland
West End plays